Juddhodaya Public High School (or JP High School) is a school in Kathmandu, Nepal. Founded by Sarada Prasad Upadhyay of Bhatbhateni, JP High School is the second oldest school in Nepal.

References

 

Schools in Nepal